The New Zealand women's under-19 cricket team represents New Zealand in international under-19 women's cricket. The team is administrated by New Zealand Cricket (NZC).

The team played their first official matches against India in late 2022, in preparation for the 2023 ICC Under-19 Women's T20 World Cup, the first ever international women's under-19 cricket competition. New Zealand reached the semi-finals of the first Under-19 Women's T20 World Cup.

History
The inaugural Women's Under-19 World Cup was scheduled to take place in January 2021, but was postponed multiple times due to the COVID-19 pandemic. The tournament was eventually scheduled to take place in 2023, in South Africa. As a Full Member of the ICC, New Zealand qualified automatically for the tournament.

In November and December 2022, in preparation for the World Cup, New Zealand played a five-match T20I series against India, losing the series 5–0 (although the New Zealand squad included some over-19 players). Subsequently, New Zealand announced their 15-player squad for the World Cup, on 13 December 2022, with former international Sara McGlashan named as Head Coach. The side went unbeaten through the first two group stages of the tournament to qualify for the semi-finals, but lost by 8 wickets to India in the semi-final.

Recent call-ups
The table below lists all the players who have been selected in recent squads for New Zealand under-19s. Currently, this only includes the squad for the 2023 ICC Under-19 Women's T20 World Cup.

Records and statistics

International match summary

Youth Women's Twenty20 record versus other nations

Leading run scorers

Leading wicket takers

Highest individual innings

Best individual bowling figures

Under-19 World Cup record

References

Women's Under-19 cricket teams
C
New Zealand in international cricket